
Gmina Ostrówek is a rural gmina (administrative district) in Lubartów County, Lublin Voivodeship, in eastern Poland.

Villages
Gmina Ostrówek contains the villages and settlements of Antoniówka, Babczyzna, Cegielnia, Dębica, Dębica-Kolonia, Jeleń, Kamienowola, Leszkowice, Luszawa, Ostrówek, Ostrówek-Kolonia, Tarkawica, Zawada, Żurawiniec and Żurawiniec-Kolonia.

Neighbouring gminas
Gmina Ostrówek is bordered by the gminas of Czemierniki, Firlej, Kock, Lubartów, Niedźwiada and Siemień.

References

Polish official population figures 2006

Ostrowek
Lubartów County